National Anthem is the debut album by North Carolina hip hop duo The Away Team, released on 6-Hole Records in 2005. The album features guest appearances from Joe Scudda, Chaundon, Smif-n-Wessun, and Little Brother's Big Pooh and Phonte. It was described by ALARM magazine as "a combination of consistent rhymes and better  stellar production".

Release history 
The album was originally issued in 2005 on 6-Hole Records. It was later issued as part of the National Mayhem Justus League box set.

Track listing 
 And Now Folks...
 The Competition
 Likka Hi (Last Call)
 The Shining
 Come on Down (featuring Smif-n-Wessun)
 The Blah Blah
 So If I Tells The Bitch Right...
 Fuck You
 Let Off a Round
 Me and My Fellows...
 Make It Hot (featuring Phonte and Joe Scudda)
 The End of the Day
 UpNAtem
 One-N-Only (featuring Percy Miracles)
 Always Be Around
 On The Line (featuring Joe Scudda, Chaundon, and Rapper Big Pooh)
 Caution
 Lights Out

References 

2005 debut albums
Albums produced by Khrysis
The Away Team (group) albums